Cashiering (or degradation ceremony), generally within military forces, is a ritual dismissal of an individual from some position of responsibility for a breach of discipline.

Etymology
From the Flemish  (to dismiss from service; to discard [troops]) the word entered the English language in the late 16th century, during the wars in the Low Countries. Although the Oxford English Dictionary states that the first printed use in this sense appears in Shakespeare's Othello (1603), it appeared in the 1595 tract The Estate of English Fugitives by Lewes Lewkenor, "imploring his help and assistance in so hard an extremity, who for recompence, very charitably cashiered them all without the receipt of one penny".

Military

It is especially associated with the public degradation of disgraced military officers. Prior to World War I, this aspect of cashiering sometimes involved a parade-ground ceremony in front of assembled troops with the destruction of symbols of status: epaulettes ripped off shoulders, badges and insignia stripped, swords broken, caps knocked away, and medals torn off and dashed upon the ground.

In the era when British Army officers generally bought their commissions, being cashiered meant that the amount they had paid was lost, as they could not "sell-out" afterwards.

Notable examples
Famous victims of cashiering include Francis Mitchell (1621), Thomas Cochrane, 10th Earl of Dundonald (after the Great Stock Exchange Fraud of 1814), Justus McKinstry, Alfred Dreyfus (1894, see trial and conviction of Alfred Dreyfus and Dreyfus affair), and Philippe Pétain (1945, stripped of all ranks and honors except Marshal of France).

Following the failure of the 1935 Greek coup d'état attempt, lieutenant colonel Christodoulos Tsigantes, his brother captain Ioannis Tsigantes, colonel Stefanos Sarafis and other participants of the coup were cashiered in a public ceremony.

While most closely associated with Captain Dreyfus, the ceremony of formal degradation occurred several times in the French military under the Third Republic. At least one other army officer and a naval officer were subjected to the ritual of having their swords broken and the insignia, braid and buttons publicly torn from their uniforms, after being found guilty of charges of treason. More commonly, a number of NCOs and private soldiers underwent similar punishments for committing various serious offenses, before execution or imprisonment.

The physical acts of ripping away insignia and breaking swords could be made easier by some prior preparation. A contemporary account in The New York Times of the Dreyfus cashiering in 1894 says:
To prepare for stripping the prisoner of his insignia of rank, the prison tailor yesterday removed all the buttons and stripes from Dreyfus’ tunic, the red stripes from his trousers and the regimental number and braid from his collar and cap. These were all replaced with a single stitch so that they could be torn away readily. The condemned man’s sword was also filed almost in two, in order that it might be easily broken. The Adjutant’s quick movement and apparent effort in breaking the sword was consequently mere pretense, as only a mere touch was necessary.

See also 
 Branded (TV series)
 Defrocking
 Demotion
 Dishonorable discharge
 Drumming out (also "drubbing out" in some varieties of American English)
 Military discipline
 Political rehabilitation
 Reduction in rank

References 

Military life
Punishments
Rituals
Ceremonies

ca:Deposició